The oleander is a poisonous plant grown as an ornamental.

Oleander may also refer to:

The Oleander wattle, tree native to Australia
Oleander, California, in Fresno County
MV Oleander, ferry
Oleander moth, Syntomeida epilais
Oleander hawk-moth, Daphnis nerii
Oleander-Rennen, German horse race
Oleander (band), American post-grunge band, or their debut EP
Matt Oleander, a fictional character in Degrassi: The Next Generation
Morceau Oleander, a fictional character in Psychonauts
Oleander, one of the main characters in the video game Them's Fightin' Herds.

See also 
White Oleander, 1999 coming-of-age novel by Janet Fitch
White Oleander (film), 2002 drama film based on the aforementioned novel